Ivo Yanakiev (born 12 October 1975) is an Olympic medal-winning rower from Bulgaria. He competed at the 2004 Olympic Games in Athens.

He won the bronze medal in the single sculls.

He competed at the 2008 Olympic Games alongside his brother – Martin in the double sculls.

References and links
 
 
 

1975 births
Living people
Bulgarian male rowers
Rowers at the 2000 Summer Olympics
Rowers at the 2004 Summer Olympics
Rowers at the 2008 Summer Olympics
Olympic rowers of Bulgaria
Olympic bronze medalists for Bulgaria
Olympic medalists in rowing
Medalists at the 2004 Summer Olympics